Thomas Symonds may refer to:
 Thomas Symonds (Royal Navy officer, died 1792), British naval captain of the American Revolutionary War
 Thomas Symonds (Royal Navy officer, died 1894), Admiral of the Fleet
 Thomas Powell Symonds, Member of Parliament (MP) for Hereford 
 Tom Symonds, Australian rugby league player